The 124th district of the Texas House of Representatives contains parts of Bexar County. The current Representative is Ina Minjarez, who was first elected in 2014.

References 

124